Matias Putkonen (4 March 1822, Kerimäki – 26 February 1868, Tuusula) was a Finnish Lutheran priest and politician. He studied theology at the University of Helsinki and was ordained a priest of the Evangelical Lutheran Church of Finland in 1848. Putkonen worked as a parish priest in Jaakkima from 1848 to 1855 and in Tuusula from 1855 until his death in 1868. He was elected Member of the Diet of Finland in 1867.

References

1822 births
1868 deaths
People from Kerimäki
People from the Grand Duchy of Finland
19th-century Finnish Lutheran clergy
Members of the Diet of Finland
University of Helsinki alumni